Janet H. Clark Entzel (born June 13, 1941) was an American politician.

Clark was born in Freeport, Illinois and graduated from Burley High School in Burley, Idaho. She graduated from Westminster College, in Salt Lake City, Utah with a bachelor's degree in education and music. Clark went to University of Minnesota for graduate work. Clark moved to Minneapolis, Minnesota in 1963. Clark was a teacher and owned a daycare center for children. She also worked for the Minnesota Education Council and the Minnesota Department of Corrections. Clark served in the Minnesota House of Representatives from 1975 to 1984 and was a Democrat.

Janet Clark Entzel has written a novel "Aka McGuire" about the criminal mind. She lived with her husband in Coon Rapids, Minnesota.

References

1941 births
Living people
Businesspeople from Minneapolis
Educators from Minnesota
People from Coon Rapids, Minnesota
People from Burley, Idaho
People from Freeport, Illinois
Politicians from Minneapolis
Writers from Illinois
Writers from Minneapolis
University of Minnesota alumni
Westminster College (Utah) alumni
Women state legislators in Minnesota
Democratic Party members of the Minnesota House of Representatives